Willard Webster Eggleston (March 28, 1863 in Pittsfield, Vermont - November 25, 1935 in Washington, D.C.) was an American botanist, employed by the United States Department of Agriculture Bureau of Plant Industry.
He graduated from Dartmouth College in 1891 with a Bachelor of Science degree. In his work on the taxonomy of Crataegus, now known to be complicated by apomixis, polyploidy, and hybridization, he aimed to simplify, counteracting the proliferation of species names that other botanists had produced.

Works

References

External links
 Biographical sketch at the Gray Herbarium site
 The Papers of Willard Webster Eggleston at Dartmouth College Library

American botanists
1863 births
1935 deaths
Dartmouth College alumni